Mike Hodges is an American politician who is currently serving as the Georgia State Senator for the 3rd district.

Education
Born in Glynn County, Hodges attended Brunswick High School and graduated in 1971. He then attended Brunswick Junior College and earned a BBA in banking and finance at the University of Georgia.

Career
Hodges was a founding director of the First Bank of Brunswick, and later its CEO. The bank was purchased by Ameris Bancorp in 2001.

Hodges announced his run for the Georgia State Senate in February 2022.

Elections
Hodges' state senate bid was endorsed by the Georgia Chamber of Commerce.

Primary and general elections, 2022
The primary election for District 3 was held on May24, 2022. The two other candidates were Nora Lott Haynes and Jeff Jones.

After no candidate won over 50% of the primary vote, a runoff between Hodges and Jeff Jones was held on June21, 2022.

In the general election, held on November 8, 2022, Hodges was unopposed.

Personal life
Hodges and his wife Dana have been married since the mid-1980s. They have two sons.

References

Living people
Republican Party Georgia (U.S. state) state senators
People from Georgia (U.S. state)
21st-century American politicians
Year of birth missing (living people)